Thomas Hasilden may refer to:

Thomas Hasilden (died c. 1387), MP for Cambridgeshire
Thomas Hasilden (died c. 1404), MP for Cambridgeshire